The Barabar Hill Caves (Hindi बराबर, Barābar) are the oldest surviving rock-cut caves in India, dating from the Maurya Empire (322–185 BCE), some with Ashokan inscriptions, located in the Makhdumpur region of Jehanabad district, Bihar, India,  north of Gaya.

These caves are situated in the twin hills of Barabar (four caves) and Nagarjuni (three caves); caves of the -distant Nagarjuni Hill are sometimes singled out as the Nagarjuni Caves. These rock-cut chambers bear dedicatory inscriptions in the name of "King Piyadasi" for the Barabar group, and "Devanampiya Dasaratha" for the Nagarjuni group, thought to date back to the 3rd century BCE during the Maurya period, and to correspond respectively to Ashoka (reigned 273–232 BCE) and his grandson, Dasharatha Maurya.

The sculptured surround to the entrance to the Lomas Rishi Cave is the earliest survival of the ogee shaped "chaitya arch" or chandrashala that was to be an important feature of Indian rock-cut architecture and sculptural decoration for centuries. The form was clearly a reproduction in stone of buildings in wood and other plant materials.

The caves were used by ascetics from the Ajivika sect, founded by Makkhali Gosala, a contemporary of Gautama Buddha, the founder of Buddhism, and of Mahavira, the last and 24th Tirthankara of Jainism. The Ajivikas had many similarities with Buddhism as well as Jainism. Also present at the site are several rock-cut Buddhist and Hindu sculptures and inscriptions from later periods.

Most caves at Barabar consist of two chambers, carved entirely out of granite, with a highly polished internal surface, the "Mauryan polish" also found on sculptures, and exciting echo effects.

The caves were featured – located in a fictitious Marabar – in the book A Passage to India by English author E. M. Forster. These were also shown in the book The Mahabharata Secret by Indian author Christopher C. Doyle.

Caves at Barabar Hill

Barabar Hill contains four caves: Karan Chaupar, Lomas Rishi, Sudama and Visvakarma. Sudama and Lomas Rishi are the earliest examples of rock-cut architecture in India, with architectural detailing made in the Mauryan period. Similar examples include the larger Buddhist Chaitya, found in Maharashtra, such as in Ajanta and Karla Caves. The Barabar caves greatly influenced the tradition of rock-cut architecture in the Indian subcontinent.

 Lomas Rishi cave has an arch-like shape facade that imitates contemporary timber architecture. On the doorway, a row of elephants proceed towards stupa emblems, along the curved architrave.
 Sudama cave was dedicated by Mauryan Emperor, Ashoka in 261 BCE. The arches of Sudama cave have bow shape. The caves consist of a circular vaulted chamber with a rectangular mandapa.
 Karan Chaupar (Karna Chaupar) consists of single rectangular room with polished surfaces, contains inscription which could be dated to 245 BCE.
 Visva karma cave, reachable by Ashoka steps hewn in the cliff, consists of two rectangular rooms.

Lomas Rishi cave

The cave of Lomas Rishi is probably the most famous of the caves of Barabar, because of its beautifully carved door. It is on the southern side of Barabar granite hill, and is adjacent to Sudama cave, which is on the left. Lomas Rishi consists of two rooms: a rectangular room measuring 9.86x5.18m, and a circular, semi-hemispherical room 5m in diameter, which is accessed from the rectangular room by a narrow rectangular passage.

This cave has an arched facade that probably imitates contemporary wooden architecture. On the periphery of the door, along the curve of the architrave, a line of elephants advances in the direction of stupa emblems. This is the characteristic form of the "Chaitya arch" or chandrashala, to be an important feature of architecture and sculpture in the rock for many centuries. It is clearly a stone reproduction of wooden buildings and other plant materials. According to Gupta, Lomas Rishi's immediate successors are the Kondivite and Guntupalli caves.

Lomas Rishi has no Ashoka inscription, perhaps because it has never been completed due to structural rock slide problems. It is generally considered, however, that it was also created around 260 BCE, like the other caves, because of the similarity of the internal structure and the degree of finish of the rock, the walls being perfectly polished, with the exception of the vault whose digging was interrupted. It has a much later inscription of Anantavarman above the entrance, from the 5th century CE.

According to Gupta, the theory that Lomas Rishi would not have received Ashoka's inscription because it was in a state of incompleteness, is undermined by the fact that the cave of Vivaskarma, another cave of Barabar, although it is not finished, was nevertheless consecrated by Ashoka. The consecration of a cave could therefore be done in the course of work. This could induce that Lomas Rishi, with its bas-reliefs, is actually posterior to Ashoka. Gupta actually believes that Lomas Rishi is posterior to both Ashoka and his grandson Dasaratha, and would have been built at the end of the Maurya Empire, under the reign of his last Emperor Brihadratha, and abruptly halted in 185 BC with the assassination of Brihadratha and the coup d'état of Pushyamitra Sunga, founder of the Sunga dynasty. Pushyamitra Sunga is also known to have persecuted Buddhists and Ajivikas, which would explain the immediate cessation of work. According to Gupta, the abrupt interruption of the works is suggested by the lack of finishing, even approximate, of the ground, with for example the abandonment in the state of some pikes of the rocks which would have required only a few minutes of chipping to be removed in order to obtain a fairly regular floor.

Questions of date and religious affiliation
Ashoka dedicated the caves of Sudama and Visvakarma to the ascetics called "Ajivikas" in the 12th year of his reign, when his religious evolution towards Buddhism was not yet fully completed. The precise identity of the Ajivikas is not well known, and it is even unclear if they were a divergent sect of the Buddhists or the Jains.

Later, Ashoka built the caves of Lomas Rishi (without dated inscription, but posterior to Sudama on architectural grounds) and Karna Chopar (19th year of his reign), at a time when he had become a firm advocate of Buddhism, as known from the Edicts of Ashoka. It was initially thought that Karna Chopar may have been dedicated to the Buddhists, based on a former reading of the inscription at the entrance of the cave, corrected by Harry Falk in 2007: the new reading shows that Karna Chopar too had been dedicated to the Ajivikas. Since Lomas Rishi has no dedicatory inscription, it has been suggested that it may had been dedicated to the Buddhists. The affiliation of Lomas Rishi to Buddhism, although unproven, would be coherent with the fact that the architecture of the gate of Lomas Rishi became a reference for the development of the Chaitya arch in Buddhist cave architecture for the following centuries, whereas the Hindus or the Jains caves essentially did not follow this architectural example. This would also mean that the decorated gate of Lomas Rishi was a Buddhist invention, which was emulated in Buddhist architecture in the following centuries. After the Barabar caves, the earliest known rock-cut Buddhist monasteries date to the 1st century BCE in the Western Ghats in western India, such as the Nasik Caves.

Sudama cave

The Sudama cave is located on the southern side of Barabar granite hill. It is close to Lomas Rishi, and on its left. It consists of two rooms: a rectangular room measuring 9.98x5.94m, and a semi-hemispherical room 6m in diameter, which is accessed from the rectangular room by a narrow rectangular passage. This is probably the first cave in the group to have been dug. This cave was dedicated by Emperor Ashoka in 257 BCE (12th year of his reign) as evidenced by an inscription in Brahmi using his protocol name (Priyadarsin, "He who brings joy") found in the entrance of the cave, whereas the cave of Lomas Rishi did not receive a dedicatory inscription:

The ceiling of the Sudama cave is arched. The cave is composed of a circular vaulted chamber and a vaulted room with the rectangular form of mandapa. The interior walls of the cave represent a technical feat: they are perfectly flat and polished granite surfaces, creating a mirror effect. On the other hand, the plane surfaces reverberate the sound, creating a very pronounced echo phenomenon. This characteristic is common to all the caves of Barabar, and, by amplifying the vibrations and the harmonies, seems to be favorable to the songs of the monks.

All of Barabar's caves share this interior polished appearance to a greater or lesser extent, with the exception of Lomas Rishi Cave, which, although designed on the same model, is only half-finished for its interior.

Karan Chaupar cave

Karan Chaupar, also known as Karna Chaupar, is on the northern side of the Barabar granite hill. It consists of a single rectangular room with polished surfaces, 10.2x4.27m in dimensions. It contains an inscription of Ashoka dating from the 19th year of his reign, about 250 BCE, located outside, immediately to the right of the entrance. Initially, it was thought from E. Hultzsch's 1925 translation, that Ashoka's inscription from Karna Chopar Cave does not mention the Ajivikas, and seems rather to refer to the Buddhist practice of retirement (vassavasa) during the rainy season. In addition, the inverted swastika with upward arrow at the end of the inscription would be more of a Buddhist character. All this suggested that this cave was planned for Buddhist monks. However, Harry Falk has recently shown with a new reading that the cave was indeed dedicated to the Ajivikas.

Traditional reading of the inscription:

This reading of the inscription has been corrected by Harry Falk in 2007, who after cleaning the stone and inspecting it read:

In particular, Falk reconstructs the last line as 𑀲𑀼𑀧𑀺𑀬𑁂𑀔𑀆𑀚𑀺𑀯𑀺𑀓𑁂𑀳𑀺𑀤𑀺𑀦𑀸 (Su[p]i[y]ekha (Ajivikehi) dinā), which means "Supriyekṣā was given to the Ājivikas".

The cave has a rock-cut bench at one end, probably to sit or sleep.

In the entrance hall an inscription from the Gupta period mentions "Daridra Kantara" ("The Cave of the Beggars"). A mound decorated with later Buddhist sculptures is also near the entrance, another element which suggested the belonging of this cave to the Buddhists.

Visvakarma cave

The Visvakarma cave, also called Viswa Mitra, is accessible by the "steps of Ashoka" carved into the cliff. It is a hundred meters and a little east of the main granite hill . It consists of a rectangular room entirely open to the outside, a sort of elongated porch, and an unfinished semi-hemispherical room: the rectangular space measures 4.27x2.54m, and the circular room is 2.8m in diameter . One goes from the rectangular room to the half-hemispherical room by a narrow trapezoidal passage. On the floor of the porch, four holes were made, which are thought to allow the cave to be closed with a wooden picket fence.

The cave of Visvakarma was offered by Ashoka to the Ajivikas in the year 12 of his reign, about 261 BCE:

Visvakarma cave, despite the fact that it is not finished, was nonetheless consecrated by Ashoka. This somewhat questions the theory that Lomas Rishi's cave would not have received Ashoka's inscription because it was in a state of incompletion. This could justify that Lomas Rishi, with his bas-reliefs, is actually posterior to Ashoka, as late as 185 BCE. This does not explain, however, why Visvakarma, consecrated in 260 BCE, has been interrupted, in the absence of a significant problem in the rock, whereas 7 years later Ashoka dedicated Karan Chaupar cave, perfectly finished, a short distance from there. Visvakarma is also the only cave that does not have "historical" inscriptions after Ashoka.

Nagarjuni Caves

The nearby caves of Nagarjuni hill were built few decades later than the Barabar caves, and consecrated by Dasaratha Maurya, Ashoka's grandson and successor, each for the Ajivikas sect. They are 1.6 kilometers east of the Barabar Caves. The three caves are:

 Gopika (Gopi-ka-Kubha), on the southside of the hill, excavated by the king Dasharatha grandson of Ashoka, according to an inscription.
 Vadithi-ka-Kubha cave, on the northside of the hill, located in a crevice, and devoted to Ajivika followers by Dasharatha.
 Vapiya-ka-Kubha cave, on the northside of the hill, also devoted to Ajivika followers by Dasharatha.

Gopika cave
Also called Gopi or Gopi-ka-Kubha or simply Nagarjuni, Gopika cave is the largest of all the caves of the Barabar complex. It consists of a single large oblong room of 13.95x5.84m. The two ends of the room have the particularity of being circular, contrary to the other caves. The cave lies on the south bank of the hill, dug by King Dasharatha grandson of Emperor Ashoka, according to the inscription that was engraved above the front door:

The cave also has the "Gopika Cave Inscription" in the entrance corridor, dated to the 5-6th century CE.

Vadathika and Vapiyaka caves

These two caves are a little higher on the north side of the hill, 300m as the crow flies. Although small, they are very beautiful, perfectly carved, caves.
 Vadathika Cave. It is located in a crevasse in the rock. It consists of a single rectangular room sized 5.11x3.43m, with a porch at the entrance of 1.83x1.68m. This cave was consecrated by Dasharatha Maurya, the grandson and successor of Ashoka, for the sect of Ajivikas.

The cave also has a much later Hindu inscription, the Vadathika Cave Inscription.

 Vapiyaka Cave, also called "Well Cave" from the meaning of its name . It consists of a single rectangular room of dimensions 5.10x3.43m. This cave was also dedicated to the Ajivikas sect by Dasharatha, with an inscription equivalent to that of the cave of Gopika. This cave also has a beautiful vaulted hall, entirely made of perfectly polished granite. It has an inscription identical to its neighbor, except for the name of the cave, as well as a number of short inscriptions of the Gupta era.

Technology

The caves were carved out of granite, an extremely hard rock, then finished with a very nice polishing of the inner surface, giving a mirror effect of a great regularity, as well as an echo effect.  This large-scale polish is reminiscent of polishing on smaller surfaces of the Maurya statuary, particularly visible on the pillars and capitals of the Ashoka pillars.

Commenting of Mauryan sculpture, John Marshall once wrote about the "extraordinary precision and accuracy which characterizes all Mauryan works, and which has never, we venture to say, been surpassed even by the finest workmanship on Athenian buildings".

Import

This remarkable and large-scale polishing technique, and in many ways without parallel, seems nevertheless to have been derived from polishing techniques in Achaemenid statuary, the stone-working techniques having spread in India after the destruction of the empire by Alexander the Great in 330 BC and the displacement of Persian and Perso-Greek artists and technicians. This know-how seems to have disappeared again after the Maurya period, none of the later caves such as the Ajanta caves having this characteristic of polished surfaces.

The very act of digging artificial caves in the rock, of which the Barabar caves represent the oldest case in India, was probably inspired by the caves dug in the rock of the Achaemenids, as is the case in Naqsh-e Rostam. It seems, however, that in India there had been an ancient tradition of ascetics using caves.

Local development

According to Gupta, the polishing of rocks could have a local origin, citing the existence of polishing technologies of the neolithic, as  visible in various stone tools such as axes. There is, however, no trace of evolution from these neolitical tools to polished stone architecture, and the Barabar caves are essentially a sudden technological break with no local history, suggesting the import of these techniques from another culture. Nor are there any known examples of stone architecture in India before the Maurya period. According to Gupta, the Son Bhandar Caves could be such an intermediate step, although relatively unique, and subject to questioning its chronology, since it is generally dated to the 2nd-4th centuries of our era.

Inscriptions by Ashoka (circa 250 BCE)

The Ashoka inscriptions of the Barabar Caves were engraved during the 12th year and the 19th year of Ashoka's reign (about 258 BCE and 251 BCE respectively, based on a coronation date of 269 BCE), for the dedication of several caves to the sect of the Ajivikas, a sect of ascetics, which flourished at the same time as Buddhism and Jainism. The words "Ajivikas" were later attacked by the chisel, probably by religious rivals, at a time when the Brahmi script was still understood (probably before the 5th century CE). However, the original inscriptions being deep, they remain easily decipherable.

The Ashoka inscriptions in the Barabar Caves are part of Ashoka's "Minor Rock Edicts", and appear in the three caves named Sudama, Visvakarma and Karna Chopar. Lomas Rishi, meanwhile, has no Ashoka inscription (only an inscription of Anantavarman above the entrance, 5-6th century CE), perhaps because she did not never been completed due to structural rock slide problems.

Ashoka and the construction of the caves
In addition to the inscriptions indicating that they were made in the 12th year of Ashoka's reign (250 BC), it is generally considered that the construction of the Barabar caves itself also dates from his reign. The fact that the cave of Vivaskarma was not consecrated by Ashoka during the 12th year of his reign, but only seven years later, argues for the hypothesis of a gradual construction of the caves under Ashoka. Similarly, the fact that the caves on Nagarjuni Hill were not consecrated by Ashoka but by his successor Dasaratha, suggests that these caves were only built after the reign of Ashoka.

Inscriptions by Dasaratha Maurya (circa 230 BCE)

Dasaratha Maurya, Ashoka's grandson and regnal successor, wrote dedicatory inscriptions in the three other caves, forming the Nagarjuni group (Gopika, Vadathi and Vapiya caves) of the Barabar hills. It is generally considered that their construction dates from his reign.

The three caves were offered to the Ajivikas upon the accession to the throne of Dasaratha, confirming that these were still active around 230 BCE, and that Buddhism was not the exclusive religion of the Mauryas at that time.

The three caves are also characterized by an extremely advanced finish of the granite walls inside, which again confirms that the technique of "Mauryan polish" did not die out with the reign of Ashoka.

Hindu inscriptions of the 5-6th century CE

Several Hindu inscriptions of the Maukhari king Anantavarman of the 5-6th century CE also appear in the caves of the Nagarjuni group, in the same caves where the dedicatory inscriptions of the grandson of Ashoka, Dasaratha, are also located: the Gopika Cave Inscription and the Vadathika Cave Inscription, as well as an inscription of Anantavarman above the cave entrance of Lomas Rishi. There are also a number of short inscriptions from the time of the Gupta Empire, generally inscribed in the entrance halls, and distributed in almost all the caves. Only the cave of Vivaskarma has received no inscriptions subsequent to his dedicatory inscription of Ashoka.

Related caves

There is another cave with the structure and polishing qualities of the Barabar caves, but without any inscription. This is the Sitamarhi Cave, 20 km from Rajgir, 10 km south-west of Hisua, also dated of the Maurya empire. It is smaller than the Barabar caves, measuring only 4.91x3.43m, with a ceiling height of 2.01m. The entrance is also trapezoidal, as for the Barabar caves.

Finally, the Jain Son Bhandar Caves in Rajgir, generally dated to the 2nd-4th centuries CE, nevertheless share a broad structure reminiscent of the caves of Barabar and some small areas of irregular polish, which leads some authors to suggest that they may actually be contemporary to, and even earlier than, the Barabar caves, and would conveniently create a precedent and an evolutionary step to the Barabar Caves.

Access by means of transportation 

The monument is accessible by the Barabar hill road which connects to the Barabar-Panari-Diha Road which is further connected to NH-83 Patna-Gaya Road (west) and SH-4 (east), via the Belaganj Barabar Road.

There are no direct public transport connections, as the nearest bus and/or railway stations are located more than 15 km away in Jehanabad, Gaya and Makhdumpur. Furthermore, Gaya Airport is located to the south and Jay Prakash Narayan International Airport in Patna (80 km away).

Hindu statuary
Outside the caves on the top of the hill, about 600 meters away, are located the Hindu temple of Vanavar Shiv Mandir and many examples of small Hindu statuary.

See also

 Kumhrar
 Edicts of Ashoka
 List of colossal sculptures in situ

Notes

References

Further reading

External links

 Detailed notes on the Barabar Caves and its use as Marabar Caves in E. M. Forster's A Passage to India
 Barabar Caves and Nagarjuni Caves, description by Wondermondo

Caves of Bihar
Buddhist caves in India
Buddhist sites in Bihar
Caves containing pictograms in India
Maurya Empire
History of Bihar
Indian rock-cut architecture
Jehanabad district
Archaeological sites in Bihar
Buddhist monasteries in India
Buddhist pilgrimage sites in India
Former populated places in India
4th century BC in India
3rd century BC in India
3rd-century BC religious buildings and structures
4th-century BC establishments in India
Tourist attractions in Bihar
Mauryan art